This is a list of largest refugee crises to occur.

List 
The list below includes the number of refugees per event with at least 1 million individuals included. This list does not include internally displaced persons (IDP). For events for which estimates vary, the geometric mean of the lowest and highest estimates is calculated to rank the events. Rows highlighted in blue indicate a present event that is occurring.

Notes

See also 
 List of countries by refugee population

References 

Forced migration
Migrant crises
Population